Psyche is the debut studio album released by British recording duo PJ & Duncan, now better known as Ant & Dec. Recording on the album began in 1993, following the release of a track the duo performed during their time on Byker Grove, "Rip it Up". The song was then re-worked into their debut single, "Tonight I'm Free", which was released in December 1993 on Telstar Records. The album includes the duo's best known track, "Let's Get Ready to Rhumble", which topped the UK Singles Chart almost two decades after its initial release.

The track would however go on to top the singles chart in 2013, nearly nineteen years after its release, after an impromptu performance of it by the duo on their show Ant & Dec's Saturday Night Takeaway.

The singles "Why Me" and "If I Give You My Number" were also released prior to the album, which was made available on 4 November 1994. Seven singles were released from the album over the course of eighteen months.

The album peaked at no. 5 on the UK Albums Chart, and was certified Platinum in the UK by the BPI. The album was reissued in Singapore in 1995, under the title Eternal Love, containing bonus remixes of "Eternal Love" itself and "Our Radio Rocks". The album was also reissued in Japan in 1995, under the title Our Radio Rocks, with the additional of remixes of "Our Radio Rocks" itself, "If I Give You My Number" and "Let's Get Ready to Rhumble". Aside from a heavy number of remixes, alternate versions, and continuations of the spoken-word eulogy "The PJ and Duncan Show", three new songs were issued as B-sides: "Style with a Smile", "So Many Questions" and "I'm a Loser", which were all written by album composers Nicky Graham, Deni Lew and Mike Olton.

Track listing
 All songs except "Tonight I'm Free" composed and produced by Nicky Graham, Deni Lew and Mike Olton
 "Tonight I'm Free" written by Richie Wermerling and produced by Nicky Graham

Charts and certifications

Certifications

B-sides
 "Rip It Up (Tonight I'm Free)" (featuring the cast of Byker Grove) (PJ & Duncan Vocals) [Rip It Up MC]
 "Rip It Up (Tonight I'm Free)" (featuring the cast of Byker Grove) (Duncan's Solo) [Rip It Up MC]
 "Tonight I'm Free" (Radio Mix) [Tonight I'm Free CD/MC/7"]
 "Tonight I'm Free" (Cool Mix) [Tonight I'm Free CD/Why Me CD/MC/7"]
 "Tonight I'm Free" (12" Remix) [Tonight I'm Free CD]
 "Tonight I'm Free" (Instrumental) [Tonight I'm Free CD/MC/7"]
 "Why Me" (Radio Mix) [Why Me CD/MC/7"]
 "Why Me" (Klassy Klub Mix) [Why Me CD]
 "Why Me" (TV Chant Mix) [Why Me CD/Limited Edition 7"]
 "Let's Get Ready to Rhumble" (100% Radio Mix) [Let's Get Ready to Rhumble CD1/CD2/MC1/MC2]
 "Let's Get Ready to Rhumble" (Housey Housey Mix) [Let's Get Ready to Rhumble CD1]
 "Let's Get Ready to Rhumble" (Klassy Dub Mix) [Let's Get Ready to Rhumble CD2]
 "Let's Get Ready to Rhumble" (Symon I Remix) [Eternal Love CD2]
 "If I Give You My Number" (100% Radio Mix) [If I Give You My Number CD1/CD2/MC1/MC2]
 "If I Give You My Number" (Toon Army Mix) [If I Give You My Number CD1]
 "If I Give You My Number" (Syze Up Mellow Mix) [If I Give You My Number CD1]
 "If I Give You My Number" (Cool Groovin' Mix) [If I Give You My Number CD2]
 "Eternal Love" (100% Pure Love Remix) [Eternal Love CD1/CD2/MC1/MC2]
 "Eternal Love" (Instrumental) [Eternal Love CD1]
 "Eternal Love" (Slow Groove Dance Mix) [Eternal Love CD2]
 "Our Radio Rocks" ('95 Radio Remix) [Our Radio Rocks CD1/CD2]
 "Our Radio Rocks" (Looney Toons House Mix) [Our Radio Rocks CD1]
 "Our Radio Rocks" (Locked in Freq Mix) [Our Radio Rocks CD2]
 "The PJ & Duncan Show Part 1" [Let's Get Ready to Rhumble CD1/MC1]
 "The PJ & Duncan Show Part 2" [Let's Get Ready to Rhumble CD2/MC2]
 "The PJ & Duncan Show Part 3" [If I Give You My Number CD1/MC1]
 "The PJ & Duncan Show Part 4" [If I Give You My Number CD2/MC2]
 "The PJ & Duncan Show Part 5" [Eternal Love CD1/CD2/MC1]
 "The PJ & Duncan Show '95" [Our Radio Rocks CD1/CD2/MC1]
 "I Want You" (Cool Mix) [Let's Get Ready to Rhumble CD2]
 "Girlfriend" (Piano Mix) [Eternal Love Japanese EP]
 "Girlfriend" (Body & Grind Mix) [Eternal Love Japanese EP]
 "Style with a Smile" [If I Give You My Number CD2]
 "So Many Questions" [Eternal Love CD1/MC2]
 "I'm a Loser" [Our Radio Rocks CD1/CD2/MC2]

References

1994 debut albums
Sony BMG albums
Ant & Dec albums